Estadio Complejo Rentistas is a multi-use stadium in Montevideo, Uruguay.  It is currently used primarily for football matches. It is the home stadium of Club Atlético Rentistas.  The stadium holds 6,500 people and was opened in 1998.

References

Complejo Rentistas
Complejo Rentistas
Sports venues in Montevideo
C.A. Rentistas